Mari Carmen Hernández Mandarino (born 16 June 1940) is a Spanish former tennis player.

Born in Madrid, Mandarino was one of Spain's top players of the 1960s and 1970s, winning four singles national championships. She won a further 23 national titles in women's doubles and mixed doubles events.

Between 1972 and 1977 she represented Spain in the Federation Cup, featuring in 12 rubbers. 

Mandarino, who originally competed under her maiden name Coronado, has been married to Brazilian Davis Cup player José Edison Mandarino since 1965.

See also
List of Spain Federation Cup team representative

References

External links
 
 
 

1940 births
Living people
Spanish female tennis players
Tennis players from Madrid